Lakshadweep Football Association (LFA) is the state governing body of football in Lakshadweep. It is affiliated with the All India Football Federation, the national governing body.

References

Football in Lakshadweep
Football governing bodies in India